Bayou is a major American literary magazine based at the University of New Orleans. The magazine was established in 2002 and is published on a biannual basis. It features poetry, fiction, essays and the winner of the annual Tennessee Williams One-Act Play Contest. Bayou published through the dislocations surrounding the aftermath of Hurricane Katrina.

Work that has appeared in Bayou has been short-listed for the Pushcart Prize.

Notable contributors

Jacob M. Appel; Sean Beaudoin; Mark Doty;  Marilyn Hacker; Lyn Lifshin; Timothy Liu;  Virgil Suarez; Tom Whalen

See also
List of literary magazines

References

External links
 

2002 establishments in Louisiana
Biannual magazines published in the United States
Literary magazines published in the United States
Magazines established in 2002
Magazines published in Louisiana
Mass media in New Orleans
University of New Orleans